Meliden railway station served the mining village of Meliden, Flintshire (now Denbighshire), Wales, on the Dyserth branch line. It was used as a way of shipping minerals from the nearby quarries at Dyserth to Prestatyn. 
The branch line to Dyserth was opened by the LNWR in 1869, initially for mineral traffic only. A passenger service was instituted in 1905 but lasted only until 1930, when it was withdrawn by the LMS. The line remained open to serve a quarry at Dyserth until complete closure in 1973. Since closure the Prestatyn to Dyserth railway has become a nature walk. All that remains is the loading gauge and goods shed.

References

Sources

Further reading

Disused railway stations in Denbighshire
Former London and North Western Railway stations
Railway stations in Great Britain opened in 1905
Railway stations in Great Britain closed in 1930